Mirjam Pressler, born Mirjam Gunkel (18 June 1940 – 16 January 2019) was a German novelist and translator. Being the author of more than 30 children's and teenage books, she also translated into German more than 300 works by other writers from Hebrew, English, Dutch and Afrikaans. She is also known for translating a revision of Anne Frank's diary, The Diary of a Young Girl, in 1991, thus renewing its copyright.

Born to a Jewish mother, Pressler was raised in a foster home. She studied painting at Städelschule in Frankfurt as well as English and French literary studies at LMU Munich. Before becoming a writer, she was a jeans shop retailer for eight years, who, as a single mother, raised three daughters. Later, she became a member of the PEN Centre Germany.

Awards

 Carl Zuckmayer Medal (2001)
 Corine Literature Prize (2009)
 Buber-Rosenzweig-Medal (2013)
 Leipzig Book Fair Prize (2015) for translation of Amos Oz's Judas
 Commanders Cross of the Order of Merit of the Federal Republic of Germany (2018)

References

External links

  (in German)

1940 births
2019 deaths
German children's writers
German women novelists
Jewish German writers
Jewish novelists
German women children's writers
Writers from Darmstadt
Commanders Crosses of the Order of Merit of the Federal Republic of Germany
20th-century German novelists
20th-century German translators
20th-century German women writers
21st-century German novelists
21st-century translators
21st-century German women writers